Paragould is the county seat of Greene County, and the 19th-largest city in Arkansas, in the United States. The city is located in northeastern Arkansas on the eastern edge of Crowley's Ridge, a geologic anomaly contained within the Arkansas delta.

Paragould is the principal city of the Paragould, Arkansas Micropolitan Statistical Area and is also a part of the Jonesboro-Paragould Combined Statistical Area. The Paragould micropolitan area's population was 42,090 at the 2010 census, and the Jonesboro-Paragould Combined Statistical Area's population was 163,116.

The city had a population of 26,113 at the 2010 census and an estimated population of 28,986 in 2019.

History
The city's name is a blend combining the last names of competing railroad magnates J. W. Paramore and Jay Gould. Paramore's Texas & St. Louis Railway (later the Cotton Belt) and Gould's St. Louis, Iron Mountain and Southern Railway (later the Missouri Pacific) intersected here in 1882.  A group of citizens chose the name, and it is believed to be the only city in the world with this name. Gould objected to his name's being second and refused to list the new town on his schedules.

Sundown town
From 1888 to 1908, Paragould experienced a series of incidents in which White residents threatened and attacked Black residents. Some Black residents were flogged, and some of their homes and churches were burned. Arkansas Governor Jeff Davis ordered the state militia not to intervene on behalf of Black citizens. On numerous occasions White residents ordered Black citizens to leave and never return. In 1908, they threatened them to leave or die, which resulted in an almost complete depopulation of African-Americans in the county, and earned Paragould the designation of a sundown town. Black children were not allowed to participate in any form of public education until 1948, and then by busing them out of the county to Booker T. Washington High School in Jonesboro. In 1957, facing mandated integration, Jonesboro terminated this practice. Prior to 1982, no hotel in Paragould would allow Black people to spend the night. In 1983, when two Black Union Pacific workers attempted to eat at a restaurant, they were locked out. When police reached the scene, they accused the workers of attempting to break into the restaurant. An informal ban on hiring African-Americans was alleged to exist in Paragould until at least 2002.

Geography
Paragould is located southeast of the center of Greene County. U.S. Routes 412 and 49 intersect in the city west of downtown. US 49 leads northeast  to Piggott and southwest  to Jonesboro. The closest major city is Memphis, Tennessee,  to the southeast.

Climate
Paragould has a humid subtropical climate (Köppen climate classification Cfa).

Demographics

2020 census

As of the 2020 United States census, there were 29,537 people, 10,755 households, and 7,439 families residing in the city.

2010 census
As of the 2010 United States Census, there were 26,113 people living in the city. The racial makeup of the city was 94.4% White, 0.8% Black, 0.4% Native American, 0.3% Asian, <0.1% Pacific Islander, <0.1% from some other race and 1.2% from two or more races. 2.8% were Hispanic or Latino of any race.

2000 census
As of the census of 2000, there were 22,017 people, 8,941 households, and 6,133 families living in the city. The racial makeup of the city was 97.9% White, <0.1% Black or African American, 0.4% Native American, 0.2% Asian, <0.1% Pacific Islander, 0.6% from other races, and 0.9% from two or more races. 1.3% of the population were Hispanic or Latino of any race.

There were 8,941 households, out of which 31.9% had children under the age of 18 living with them, 53.7% were married couples living together, 11.4% had a female householder with no husband present, and 31.4% were non-families.  27.5% of all households were made up of individuals, and 13.0% had someone living alone who was 65 years of age or older. The average household size was 2.40 and the average family size was 2.92.

In the city, the population was spread out, with 24.8% under the age of 18, 9.6% from 18 to 24, 28.0% from 25 to 44, 21.7% from 45 to 64, and 15.8% who were 65 years of age or older. The median age was 36 years. For every 100 females, there were 90.7 males. For every 100 females age 18 and over, there were 86.9 males.

The median income for a household in the city was $30,815, and the median income for a family was $39,431. Males had a median income of $28,103 versus $20,623 for females. The per capita income for the city was $18,076. About 8.4% of families and 12.0% of the population were below the poverty line, including 12.1% of those under age 18 and 12.1% of those age 65 or over.

Education
Paragould is home to Crowley's Ridge College, and a campus of Black River Technical College.

Paragould has two public school districts serving different parts of the city: the Greene County Tech School District and the Paragould School District. It also has Crowley's Ridge Academy and St. Mary's Catholic School private school systems.

The Northeast Arkansas School District was formed on July 1, 1985, by the merger of the former Paragould School District with the Oak Grove School District. By 1997 the name of the new district became the Paragould School District.

Television
KPMF-LD, a MyNetworkTV/Quest affiliated TV station serving the Jonesboro and Memphis markets, and owned by HC2 Holdings.

K17LV-D, translator station of ABC/NBC/CW+ affiliated station KAIT in Jonesboro, and owned by Atlanta-based Gray Television.

Infrastructure

Transportation

Highways

Health care
Arkansas Methodist Medical Center is Paragould's only hospital. The 127-bed acute-care hospital's campus includes a professional office building with a community wellness center.

Law enforcement
On December 15, 2012, it was announced that "beginning in 2013, the department would deploy a new street crimes unit to high crime areas on foot to take back the streets." The remaining town hall meetings to inform the public of the new plan were cancelled due to the volume of threats received as a result of national media exposure. This was done for public safety, as continuing to hold the meetings may have posed a danger to attendees. The planned unit was not deployed.

Cultural appearances
The documentary short film Udaan (2021) was made by Pakistani film maker Amman Abbasi about Baneen Khan, a female Pakistani student from Karachi enrolling at Black River Technical College.

Notable people

 Weldon Bowlin, Major League Baseball player
 Jeanne Carmen, actress, glamour girl and famed trick-shot golfer
 Iris DeMent, singer-songwriter
 Jimmie Lou Fisher, Arkansas State Treasurer, 2002 Democratic nominee for governor of Arkansas
 Junius Marion Futrell, governor of Arkansas, 1933–1937
 Trice Harvey, California politician
 Homer Lenderman, former state representative for Craighead and Greene counties
 Sam O'Steen, Academy Award-nominated editor
 Lee Purcell, Emmy Award-nominated actress
 Marlin Stuart, Major League Baseball player
 Marko Stunt, Professional Wrestler for All Elite Wrestling
 George Taylor, Medal of Honor awardee for his actions during the Civil War
 Richard Travis, actor from 1940s films
 James Wayne Wood, former aeronautical engineer, U.S. Air Force officer, test pilot and astronaut in the X-20 Dyna-Soar program

References

External links

 
 Paragould Regional Chamber of Commerce

 
Cities in Arkansas
Cities in Greene County, Arkansas
Micropolitan areas of Arkansas
County seats in Arkansas
Populated places established in 1883
1883 establishments in Arkansas